Guadalupe Bay is a slender inlet of San Antonio Bay in Calhoun County, Texas, United States, near the settlements of Seadrift and Long Mott. It is fed by the Guadalupe River, and is the site of the river's two mouths.

History
The etymology of Guadalupe Bay derived from the Guadalupe River, which was named in honor of Our Lady of Guadalupe by Alonso De León.

The bay formed as the Guadalupe River delta discharge extended into San Antonio Bay, forming the subdelta headland that can now be found between the Hynes and Guadalupe Bays. While the bay's formation as it is known today was not finalized until about 500 years ago (and is continuing to change), human settlement predates the current formation. The Karankawa Indians resided on the Guadalupe Bay sporadically during the past 2,500 years. Archeological evidence suggests that during the active periods, the Karankawa migrated seasonally between the bays and the inland. During the winter months, groups of about 500 would arrive at the bay to fish, hunt and collect shellfish. The salinity of the bay decreased as the San Antonio River joined with the Guadalupe River about 1,500 years ago, diminishing the shellfish population.

By 1967, dredging was complete on the Victoria Barge Canal from Victoria to the Intracoastal Waterway, and ran along the shore of Guadalupe Bay. During the construction, ancient artifacts and middens were discovered. Shortly thereafter, the Guadalupe Bay Archeological Site was established.

Ecosystem
Finfish found in the bay include Black drum, redfish, sheepshead and spotted seatrout. In the upper reaches, the freshwater varieties of channel catfish, flathead catfish and gar have been caught. Oysters are native to the bay, but cannot be harvested due to restrictions by the Texas Department of State Health Services. Shrimping is likewise prohibited due to its classification as a nursery bay.

References

Bodies of water of Calhoun County, Texas
Guadalupe River (Texas)
Bays of Texas